Now That's What I Call Music! 35 was released on August 31, 2010. The album is the 35th edition of the (U.S.) Now! series. It features the number-one Billboard Hot 100 hit, "California Gurls".

Now 35 debuted at number two on the Billboard 200, moving 105,000 units in its first week of release. In November 2010, the album was certified Gold by the RIAA.

Track listing

Reception

Andy Kellman of AllMusic calls Now! 35 "one of the more 'now' volumes of the series" with only one of its 16 hits not in the Hot 100 at the time of its release. However, the rock selections on the album "seem like arbitrary throw-ins".

Charts

Weekly charts

Year-end charts

References

External links
 Official U.S. Now That's What I Call Music website

2010 compilation albums
 035
EMI Records compilation albums